Kyle Patrick Alvarez (born 1983) is an American film director and screenwriter.

Early life and education
Alvarez was born in Miami, and attended the University of Miami.

Career
His first film, Easier with Practice, was based on a GQ article by Davy Rothbart. Alvarez then adapted a short story by David Sedaris into the film C.O.G., which premiered at the 2013 Sundance Film Festival, and was released later that year.

Alvarez's third film, The Stanford Prison Experiment, a thriller dramatizing 
the 1971 experiment of the same name, premiered at the 2015 Sundance Film Festival, where it received the Alfred P. Sloan Prize. It received positive reviews and was distributed by IFC Films. Alvarez has also directed four episodes of the Netflix series 13 Reasons Why.

Alvarez directed the second season of the Amazon series Homecoming which premiered on May 22, 2020.

Personal life
Alvarez lives in Los Angeles. He is openly gay.

Filmography

Television

References

External links 
 
 

1983 births
21st-century American male writers
American male screenwriters
American television directors
American gay writers
Living people
Film directors from Florida
LGBT film directors
LGBT people from Florida
Screenwriters from Florida
University of Miami alumni
Writers from Miami
21st-century American screenwriters
Alfred P. Sloan Prize winners
LGBT television directors